Wesley Triplett Sigman (January 17, 1899 in Mooresville, North Carolina – March 8, 1971 in Augusta, Georgia), was a Major League Baseball player who played outfielder for the Philadelphia Phillies from  to .

External links

1899 births
1971 deaths
People from Mooresville, North Carolina
Major League Baseball outfielders
Philadelphia Phillies players
Baseball players from North Carolina
Cleveland Manufacturers players
Nashville Vols players
Mooresville Moors players
Newton-Conover Twins players